Zestusa dorus, the short-tailed skipper, is a species of dicot skipper in the butterfly family Hesperiidae. It is found in Central America and North America.

References

Further reading

 

Eudaminae
Articles created by Qbugbot